Karasaz may refer to:

Kara-Saz, Naryn Region, Kyrgyzstan
Karasaz, Elâzığ, Elazığ Province, Turkey
Karasaz, Almaty Region, Kazakhstan
Karasaz, Zhambyl Region, Kazakhstan